Rivercrest High School may refer to:

 Rivercrest High School (Arkansas), located in Mississippi County, Arkansas (near Wilson).
 Rivercrest High School (Texas), located in Bogata, Texas.